Chilsworthy railway station served the village of Chilsworthy, Cornwall, England, from 1909 to 1966 on the Callington Branch.

History 
The station was opened on 1 June 1909 by the Plymouth, Devonport and South Western Junction Railway. It initially had one siding which served Messrs Hill, West lake and Company's Brick and Tile Works. It was known as Chilsworthy Halt in the 1938 and 1956 editions of the handbook of stations as well as British Rail tickets. A second siding was added in 1956, which was operated by the Ministry of Defence. The station closed on 7 November 1966.

References 

Disused railway stations in Cornwall
Railway stations in Great Britain opened in 1909
Railway stations in Great Britain closed in 1966
1909 establishments in England
1966 disestablishments in England
Beeching closures in England